Xinfeng County is a county under the jurisdiction of the prefecture-level city of Ganzhou, in the far south of Jiangxi province, bordering Guangdong province to the west.

Administration
The county executive, legislature, and court are located in the Town of Jiading, together with the local party headquarters and Public Security Bureau branches.

The county is divided into 16 towns and townships, and one provincial-level industrial park. This is in turn divided into 260 administrative villages and 27 neighbourhood committees.

In the present, Xinfeng County has 13 towns and 3 townships.
13 towns

3 townships
 Hushan
 Chongxian
 Wanlong

Climate

References

 
Ganzhou
County-level divisions of Jiangxi